Terek Pass (elevation 3,710 m / 12,172 ft.) is a year-round pass in the Alay Mountains in the Osh oblast of Kyrgyzstan. It was historically the principal pass to enter the Tarim Basin from West Turkestan. It is also known as Terek-Davan, Terek-Dawan, and Terek-Bavan pass.

Terek Pass lies on the principal medieval trading route from Kashgar, via Irkeshtam and Osh, to Ferghana and Samarkand.

Marco Polo crossed the pass to enter China, and it was used by Genghis Khan to enter central Asia.

See also
 Geography of Kyrgyzstan
 Geostrategy in Central Asia

References

Mountain passes of Kyrgyzstan